The Lord of Misrule was an officer to preside over the medieval Feast of Fools.

Lord of Misrule may also refer to:

 Lord of Misrule (novel), a 2010 novel by Jaimy Gordon
 Lord of Misrule: The Autobiography of Christopher Lee, 2003
 Lord of Misrule, a 2009 novel by Rachel Caine (book 5 of The Morganville Vampires series)

See also
Lords of Misrule (disambiguation)